Archibald Ernest Clement (born 27 November 1901 – 1984) was an English professional footballer who played as a right back for a number of clubs in the Football League, including Millwall, Watford, New Brighton and Southport.

References

1901 births
1984 deaths
People from Grays, Essex
Grays Athletic F.C. players
Whitstable Town F.C. players
Dartford F.C. players
Chatham Town F.C. players
Millwall F.C. players
Watford F.C. players
New Brighton A.F.C. players
Yeovil Town F.C. players
Southport F.C. players
Sittingbourne F.C. players
Canterbury Waverley F.C. players
English Football League players
English footballers
Association football fullbacks